( The mystery of Kaal Bhairav) is an Indian thriller television series. The series ran for two seasons from October 2017 to April 2019. 
Both seasons are based on written works of Indra Soundarrajan. The story of first season is based on his Tamil novel A Secret, The second season story is based on the supernatural thriller tale of Soundarrajan titled The Palace of Kottaipuram. The series featured different cast in each season although many cast members appeared in both seasons as different characters

.It is also dubbed in Telugu as Kala Bhairava Rahasyam and aired on Star Maa.

Broadcasting
This story is based on the supernatural thriller by the veteran Tamil writer Indra Soundarrajan, The Palace of Kottaipuram which was also made into a successful daily soap under the same name in 1990
The first season titled Kaal Bhairav Rahasya aired from 30 October 2017 to 30 April 2018 on Star Bharat.
 and is shot in Bhopal and starred Chhavi Pandey, Rahul Sharma, Sargun Kaur Luthra and Mohammed Iqbal Khan. The Second Season Starred Additi Gupta and Gautam Rode.
Both the series were popular among viewers.

Series

Plot

Season 1
The story is based on a Tamil novel Ragasiyamaga Oru Ragasiyam which was also made into a serial called Marmadesam by Indra Soundarrajan, and aired on television in the 90s.

The story begins with Inder (Mohammed Iqbal Khan), a reporter, who goes to Bandiipur's Kaalbhairav temple. He stays in the temple after the villagers leave. Alone at night, he hears strange sounds and the next morning he is found dead. Inspector Akshay (Arun Singh Rana) decides to stay in the temple to investigate. That night once again sounds of drums are heard followed by a gunshot. In the morning they find Akshay has gone missing.

A young man named Nandu (Rahul Sharma) arrives and tells the villagers that he has come to work as the village priest's assistant. He befriends the village chief, Dada Thakur's daughter, Namrata (Chhavi Pandey), and the priest's daughter, Gauri (Sargun Kaur Luthra).

A few days after Inder's death, his widow Preeti (Puja Joshi) and daughter Minty settle down in the village to find the truth of Inder's death. Namrata's brother, Aditya (Ahwaan Kumar), likes Preeti but she mistrusts everyone in the village. Nandu is revealed to be Inder's younger brother, Rahul, and is also investigating Inder's death secretly. Namrata and Aditya find out his identity but promise to keep his secret. Rahul and Namrata find Inder's camera footage but it leads them nowhere.

Nandu / Rahul wins the  contest during  celebrations and asks Data Thakur permission to spend a night in the temple as his reward. Nandu survives but gets badly injured. Dada Thakur discovers Rahul's identity and asks Inder's family to leave the village. Rahul believes that someone disguises as Kaal Bhairav and kills people in the temple. At first he suspects the village head/Sarpanch and Shakti Thakur but they turn out to be innocent.

Gauri falls in love with Rahul, as does Namrata but Rahul is focussed on his search. Lakhanpal locks Gauri in the temple after sunset to avenge his insult. Gauri prays to Kaal Bhairav all night and is saved. She starts having dreams that turn to reality. Finally, it is revealed that the mystery behind all the murders is Namrata. When Aditya chances upon her truth, she is forced to kill her own brother.

While Rahul and Gauri are on the run from Lakhanpal, Data Thakur also discovers Namrata's secret and tries to fight her. She and her men overpower him and she reveals that she is avenging her mother's death who was killed by Data Thakur. She also wants to get the nine golden  (idols) and wants Rahul to return her love. She also reveals that she has left a trace of evidence implicating Data Thakur for all the murders.

Meanwhile, Rahul falls in love with Gauri. Preeti and Gauri's father accept their love but Gauri decides to wait till there is peace in the village. The story focuses on the search for the nine golden . Still pretending to be innocent, Namrata and Gauri look for them together by following Gauri's dreams though Namrata wants to kill Gauri once the search is over. Also searching for the idols are Rahul, Dr. Srivastava and CID Officer Yash Pal.

Namrata is secretly helped by her friend Latika (Simar Kaur Suri) who has kidnapped Data Thakur and Lakhan Pal to keep them quiet. Namrata succeeds in finding five of the nine . Gradually, Gauri becomes aware of Namrata's true intentions. She succeeds in rescuing Data Thakur and Lakhan Pal and they join forces to expose Namrata. In trying to obtain another , Namrata and Rahul meet a man who has the idol. Namrata emotionally manipulates him and he shows her how she can use magic to control Rahul. Latika tries to dissuade her but is rejected by Namrata. Namrata uses the magic on Rahul who tries to kill Gauri on Namrata's orders when she tells him about Namrata. Gauri is saved by Latika who seemingly mends her ways.

It is then revealed that Inder is still alive and living under the identity of Seth ji. He faked his death to obtain the nine idols for money. Latika is revealed to be Inder's second wife who has been working with him. She tries to kill Rahul in the temple but Namrata, who has reformed and is ready to repent, saves Rahul. Inder gets furious seeing Latika die, pick up knife and in turn stabs Namrata in her stomach who dies in Rahul's arms.

However, the temple is surrounded by angry villagers. Inder threatens them that he has hidden bombs all across the village and will detonate them. At that moment, Rudra, the truck driver who claimed to be a messenger of God, is revealed to be none than Lord Kaal Bhairav in disguise, and comes to aid Rahul, Gauri and the other villagers.

Season 2
This story is based on the supernatural thriller by the veteran Tamil writer Indra Soundarrajan, The Palace of Kottaipuram which was also made into a successful daily soap under the same name in 1990.
 
The story begins in the year 1868, with a woman named Lali carrying her child, trying to escape from King Vikram Singh (Manoj Verma) and his guards. She seeks shelter in Kaal Bhairav's temple but is unfortunately caught by the king. He kills her son and rapes her. The villagers reach the temple but the king has already stabbed her by then. Lali curses the evil king that all his future successors will die before celebrating their 30th birthday and his lineage will come to an end.
 
The story then shifts to the current time. Veervardhan / Veer is a descendant of the evil king. Living happily in Bhopal, away from the cursed Kanakgarh Palace, he proposes marriage to his friend, Archie but on receiving a call from his elder brother, Yashvardhan, Veer is reminded of the curse. On Yashvardhan's 30th birthday, Veer visits the palace only to find that his brother is in hiding waiting for the curse to pass. 
 
However, in the last few moments of the curse, Yashvardhan is stabbed in the back by a trident and eventually dies. Following his death, a police officer named Sumer Singh tries to investigate the case of Yashardhan's death. However, he goes missing and people believe he was punished by Kaal Bhairav. Fearing for his own death, Veer orders his friend Kedar to drop Archie at the airport and instructs her to leave. However, on receiving a call from an unknown source, Archie is alerted when the caller warns of Nagveli peasants planning an attack on Veer. At the site of Yashvardhan's funeral, Veer is attacked by goons but with Archie's help, he survives. Scared for his life, Veer decides to flee from Kanakgarh and asks Archie to do the same and assures her of meeting in Bhopal within two days but Maharani learns of his plan and alerts all the security personnel to stop Veer from leaving the palace. Though Veer manages to escape by fooling the guards. Fearing Lord Kaal Bhairav's wrath the villagers decide to leave Kanakgarh. Archie too manages to escape from the palace and joins the fleeing villagers. They are stopped mid-way by Laali's drifting soul. Ill omens start to haunt the villagers due to Veer's absence with humans being converted into earthen lamps by Kaal Bhairav. Unable to flee from the village the villagers take shelter in the Kaal Bhairav temple where Rajguru on Maharani's orders asks them to trap Archie to make Veer return to the palace by using her as bait. Archie flees from the temple. She calls Dolly and asks her to stop Veer from returning to Kanakgarh.She then calls Kedar for help who in turn gets her caught by the villagers. Veer learns from Dolly that Archie is in trouble and rushes back to Kanakgarh to help her. When Veer returns to the village he is asked to flog his family members with a whip as a punishment for violating the rules of the curse. To Archie's shock, when Veer fulfils the punishment, she witnesses the earthen lamps kept inside the shrine of the temple, being covered in a thick cloud of smoke, getting replaced by the villagers.

A  (bride-choosing ceremony) is organised for Veer with four women, including Archie. The brides are supposed to pass a tough test which could even lead to their deaths and the survivor would be chosen as Veer's wife. Veer hides the other three women in Kaal Bhairav's temple and decides to face the test with Archie. As a part of the test they are required to go to Laali's abandoned house and fetch black mud from the idol of Lord Kaal Bhairav . When they reach there they experience paranormal activities and Veer sees the headless spirits of his ancestors praying along with Laali's soul in front of the idol of Lord Kaal Bhairav. Archie follows Laali's spirit towards the forest to ask for forgiveness and lift her curse upon Veer and his family. Veer runs behind her and tries to stop her but gets attacked by Kaal Bhairav while Archie is shown to be killed by Kaal Bhairav's trident. Veer is rescued by a woman named Bhairavi (Barkha Sengupta) who claims to be Kaal Bhairav's daughter. No one believes her at first but she makes her story credible by revealing to them some dark secrets of the royal family members and also replacing the dog with Sumer Singh in a closed room with everyone believing that the police officer had returned to his original self by the grace of Kaal Bhairav. She also claims that she is the only one who can bring Archie back but the illegitimate successor of the royal family needs to be identified. Revati (Sonia Singh) gets anxious as her son, Jai (Viraaj Kapoor) does not have royal blood. Meanwhile, Kedar who is looking for Archie in the forest, sees the same dog that everyone presumed to be Officer Sumer Singh and also spots Bhairavi with a woman dressed up as Lali's drifting soul. He starts believing everything to be a scam concocted by Bhairavi and records everything on his phone as a proof. Veer gets to know that Kedar is his step brother. He rushes to the forest to save him but he Kedar has already been killed.

Archie returns and Veer, believing in the magic of Bhairavi, decides to marry her. Archie and Sumer try to expose Bhairavi but fail. However, with Tittu's help, Archie and Veer are married. Kedar's brother, Neeraj blames Veer for Kedar's death and joins Bhairavi in her evil plans. Archie discovers a secret tunnel inside the palace. Bhairavi tries to kill Veer who is saved by Archie. Archie and Sumer are abducted by Bhairavi and see her taking orders from a man wearing Kaal Bhairav's mask whom she calls "Bhagwan". Eventually, Veer sees Bhairavi's true colours, As Bhagwan instructs Bhairavi to kill Veer . A monk saves Veer and Archie but Bhairavi is injured. The monk tells Veer that Bhairavi's brother was being held by Bhagwan who was forcing her to kill Veer.

Veer rescues Bhairavi's brother. Archie expose her to everyone. Maharani dies and a mysterious prophesy predicts that one royal would die every week. Bhairavi is possessed by Maharani's ghost to kill Veer but she fails and dies. Lord Kaal Bhairav sends Archie a signal in a dream helping her find the bearded man who is revealed to be Rajguru in disguise and has been keeping the royal princesses hostage and killed Kedar to avenge what was done to his sister, Lali. Veer then discovers that the king who killed Lali was not actually a royal. It is then revealed that the real mastermind is Brahmanand, the evil heir of Lali who is conspiring against the royal family by making different people pawns in his game. Through a series of events, Veer and Archie defeat him with the help of Lord Kaal Bhairav and live happily ever after.

Cast and characters

Season 1

Main
 Rahul Sharma as Rahul Prakash / Nandu: Inder's younger brother; Namrata's love interest; Gauri's fiancé
Sargun Kaur Luthra as Gauri: Rahul's fiancé; Pujari Ji and Kalavati's daughter; Anand's sister
 Chhavi Pandey as Namrata Vishambar Pratap Singh: Data Thakur's daughter; Rahul's one-sided lover; Aditya's sister

Recurring
 Puja Joshi as Preeti Inder Prakash, Inder's wife, Minty's mother, Rahul's sister-in-law.
 Mohammed Iqbal Khan as Inder Prakash / Sethji: Preeti's husband; Minty's father; Rahul's elder brother; Latika's affair interest
 Raj Premi as Dada Thakur/ Vishambar Pratap singh, Namrata and Aditya's father, Shakti devi's cousin, Former village chief
 Sunila Karambelkar as Shakti Devi Thakur, Data thakur's cousin, Namrata and Aditya's aunt, Village chief
 Saurabh Dubey as Pandit ji, The village's priest, Anand and Gauri's father, Kalavati's husband
 Amita Nangia as Surili / Garudi, a sorcerer
 Manoj Kolhatkar as Garudi's husband, who wants to stop Garudi from doing bad work.
 Pankaj Vishnu as Lakhan Paal, Dada Thakur's bodyguard who is obsessed with Gauri
 Prithvi Zutshi as Sarpanch, Soumya's father
 Mukul Nag as Shambhu Baba, the real Lord Kaal Bhairav's vahan (Schwan)
 Aamir Dalvi as Rudra, the real Lord Kaal Bhairav
 Rajesh Puri as Dr. Narendra Shrivastava, Nathu a mental patient at Shambhu Baba's Ashram
 Madhavi Gogate as Kalavati, Gauri and Anand's mother, Pandit ji's wife
 Rakesh Kukreti as Chief Minister
 Neha Mishra as Saumya, Gauri's friend, Sarpanch's daughter, Sheru's sister, Anand's love interest
 Prakash Ramchandani as CID Officer Yashpal Rathi
 Ahwaan Kumar as Aditya Pratap Singh, Data thakur's son, Namrata's brother.
 Nivin Ramani as Anand, Pandit ji and Kalavati's son, Gauri's brother, Saumya's love interest
 Arun Singh Rana as Inspector Akshay, Inder's friend
 Manan Joshi as Shamsher / Sheru, sarpanch's son and Soumya's brother
 Somesh Aggarwal as Vaid ji, Village's elder
 Shyam Mashalkar as Manoj, Inder's colleague
 Vivek Bhadauria as Shankar
 Simran Kaur Suri as Latika, Inder's affair interest

Season 2

Main
 Additi Gupta as Archana Singh alias Archie / Yuvrani: Laali's last descendant; Veer's wife
 Gautam Rode as Veer Vardhan Singh alias Bade Yuvraj: The king of Kanakgarh; Raj and Swamini's younger son; Rajmata's grandson; Yash's younger brother; Kedar and Neeraj's step-brother; Archana's husband

Recurring
 Aayam Mehta as Rajguru/ Bramannand
 Kenisha Bhardwaj as Vandana Singh: Yash's wife
 Barkha Sengupta as Bhairavi: An impostor who was forced to pretend as Lord Kaal Bhairav's daughter as her brother was kidnapped by the fake 'Bhagwan'; Neeraj's partner
 Ahwaan Kumar as Akshay Sukhreja alias Rudra: Yash and Veer's bodyguard
 Sonia Singh as Revati Singh: Ram's wife; Kashinath's secret lover; Yash, Veer, Kedar and Neeraj's aunt; Jai's mother
 Raj Premi as Vishambhar Pratap Singh: The chief of a village; Abhiram's father
 Kumar Hegde as Kashinath Thakur: The chief security officer of Palace; Revati's secret lover; Jai's father
 Vineeta Malik as Chandrika Singh alias Rajmata: Raj and Ram's mother; Swamini and Revati's mother-in-law; Yash, Veer, Kedar and Neeraj's grandmother
Alefia Kapadia as Pavitra: A villager and Yash's former lover, pregnant with his child
 Pankaj Vishnu as Inspector Sumer Singh
 Shresth Kumar as Neeraj Singh / fake Abhiram Pratap Singh: Raj and Kunika's illegitimate younger son; Rajmata's grandson; Kedar's younger brother; Yash and Veer's step-brother; Bhairavi's partner
 Swati Anand as Kunika Choudhry: Raj's mistress; Kedar and Neeraj's mother; Yash and Veer's step-mother
 Satya Tiwari as Kedar Singh: Raj and Kunika's illegitimate elder son; Rajmata's grandson; Swamini's step-son; Neeraj's elder brother; Yash and Veer's step-brother
 Seema Pandey as Swamini Devi Singh alias Maharani: Raj's wife; Yash and Veer's mother; Kedar and Neeraj's step-mother; Vandana and Archana's mother-in-law
 Viraaj Kapoor as Jaywant Thakur alias Jai: Kashinath and Revati's illegitimate son
 Siddhant Karnick as Yash Vardhan Singh: Raj and Swamini's elder son; Rajmata's grandson; Veer's elder brother; Kedar and Neeraj's step-brother; Vandana's husband
 Anjali Abrol as Lalita Yatopadhyay alias Laali: Archana's ancestor, earlier known as Kaal Bhairav's daughter and killed by Vikram
 Vandana Vithlani as Hemangi Dasgupta: Principal of a local school
 Manoj Verma as King Vikram Singh: The 19th century ruler of Kanakgarh; Laali's murderer

Production
Initially shot in Indore, the climax of season 1 of the series was shot at Madhya Pradesh.

Production Crew

1. Creative Director: Tanvesh Jain has been working in the Tv industry for more than a decade as Creative Director. 
2. Creative head: Atul Kumar Sharma (born 13 October 1991)  is an Indian writer, author, Sr. creative head and content creator. He has worked as a creative head in various television series like Kaal Bhairav Rahasya, Vidya, Mariam Khan - Reporting Live, Ayushman Bhava and Crime Patrol. Atul Kumar Sharma has over seven years of experience in the Indian Television industry. Atul Kumar Sharma has written 3 books which are available on amazon and google play store.
3. Associate Director: Pratik Harphale has been working in the Tv and web industry as a director and has directed many Tv shows for more than a decade.
4. Director: Dharmesh Shah
5. Director: Vaibhav singh
6. Costume Designer: Winne Malhotra
7. Director: Ravindra Gautam is an Indian film/serial director, script writer and producer. He made his directorial debut with Kasauti Zindagi Ki. Gautam received "ITA Award for Best Director-Drama" for direction in Bade Achhe Lagte Hain. Recently directed SonyLIV series Maharani 2.
8. Associate Director: Gyanendra Pratap Singh
9. Assistant Director: Himanshu Baluni, Aarti Bhatt, Krishna Shah, Aman Bhardwaj
10. Costume AD: Beauty Malakar
11. Post Creative: Nupur Vashisht, Abhilash Vats
12. Production Manager: Neelam Daswani, Ayush Bellore
13. Casting Director: Sonu Singh Solanki, Asad Sheikh, Ajay Kabir, Sourabh Sharma
14. Cameraman: Raj Panth, Veerdhawal Puranik, Suhas Mahadik

References

External links 
 

Star Bharat original programming
Hindi-language television shows
2017 Indian television series debuts
Indian mystery television series
Indian thriller television series
Hindi-language television series based on Tamil-language television series
Television shows based on Tamil-language novels